London Belongs to Me (also known as Dulcimer Street) is a British film released in 1948, directed by Sidney Gilliat, and starring Richard Attenborough and Alastair Sim. It was based on the novel London Belongs to Me by Norman Collins, which was also the basis for a seven-part series made by Thames Television shown in 1977.

Plot
The film concerns the residents of a large terraced house in London between Christmas 1938 and September 1939. Among them are the landlady, Mrs Vizzard (played by Joyce Carey), who is a widow and a believer in spiritualism; Mr and Mrs Josser (Wylie Watson and Fay Compton), and their teenage daughter Doris (Susan Shaw); the eccentric spiritualist medium Mr Squales (Sim); the colourful Connie Coke (Ivy St. Helier), the young motor mechanic Percy Boon (Attenborough) and his mother (Gladys Henson).

Percy is in love with the Jossers' daughter and turns to crime to raise money to impress her with, but he bungles a car theft and finds himself accused of murder. Mr Josser digs into his retirement fund to hire the boy a lawyer. Mr Squales testifies against Percy, but in the process exposes to his fiancée Mrs Vizzard the falsity of his claims to be able to contact the dead and to predict the future.

Percy is found guilty, but his neighbours rally to his defence. With the assistance of Mr Josser's staunchly socialist Uncle Henry (Stephen Murray), they gather thousands of signatures on a petition to win him a reprieve. At the end of the film, Percy's supporters march through the rain to the Houses of Parliament, only to discover just before their arrival that clemency has already been granted.

Cast

 Richard Attenborough as Percy Boon
 Alastair Sim as Mr Squales
 Fay Compton as Mrs Josser
 Stephen Murray as Uncle Henry Knockell
 Wylie Watson as Mr Josser
 Susan Shaw as Doris Josser
 Joyce Carey as Mrs Kitty Vizzard
 Ivy St. Helier as Connie Coke
 Andrew Crawford as Bill
 Hugh Griffith as Headlam Fynne
 Eleanor Summerfield as Myrna Watson
 Gladys Henson as Mrs Boon
 Maurice Denham as Jack Rufus
 Ivor Barnard as Mr Justice Plymme
 Cecil Trouncer as Mr Henry Wassall
 Arthur Howard as Mr Chinkwell
 John Salew as Mr Barks
 Cyril Chamberlain as Detective Sergeant Wilson
 Aubrey Dexter as Mr Battlebury
 Jack McNaughton as Jimmy
 Henry Hewitt as Verriter
 Fabia Drake as Mrs Jan Byl
 Sydney Tafler as Nightclub Receptionist
 Henry Edwards as Police Superintendent
 George Cross as Inspector Cartwright
 Edward Evans as Detective Sergeant Taylor
 Russell Waters as Clerk of the Court
 Kenneth Downey as Mr Veezey Blaize, KC
 Basil Cunard as Foreman of the Jury
 Wensley Pithey as First Warden
 Manville Tarrant as Second Warden
 Leo Genn as narrator

Production
Filming started 6 November. The film was shot at Pinewood Studios. The main street was an interior set, but additional location filming took place around London, and at Burnham Beeches in Buckinghamshire.

Patricia Roc was originally cast in the female lead, but says she pulled out because she did not want to keep playing Cockney roles. She was replaced by Susan Shaw. Sidney Gilliat however says Earl St John asked if Gilliat could use one of Rank's contract stars like Pat Roc, Margaret Lockwood or Jean Kent; Gilliant chose Roc as he had worked well with her on Millions Like Us. "And she was all wrong and I had to throw her out, so it cost a lot of money and a lot of pain," said Gilliat.

The film includes the first screen appearance of Arthur Lowe, who makes a brief and uncredited appearance as a commuter on a train.

Reception
Trade papers called the film a "notable box office attraction" in British cinemas in 1948.

The Monthly Film Bulletin wrote, "Norman Collins' story, which is Dickensian in the richness of its pathos and kindly humour, has been triumphantly captured on the screen."

Television series
The novel was also adapted for Thames Television as a series, broadcast in seven one-hour episodes from 6 September to 18 October 1977. The cast included Derek Farr as Mr Josser, Madge Ryan as Mrs Vizzard and Patricia Hayes as Connie Coke.

References

External links

BFI article and resources on the film
Seamas Duffy's article on the London Fictions site about the novel on which the film was based

1948 films
1948 comedy-drama films
British comedy-drama films
Films with screenplays by Frank Launder and Sidney Gilliat
Films directed by Sidney Gilliat
Films scored by Benjamin Frankel
Films set in London
Films shot at Pinewood Studios
Films set in 1938
Films set in 1939
British black-and-white films
1940s English-language films
1940s British films